Tony A. Freyer is an American lawyer currently University Research Professor Emeritus at University of Alabama School of Law, and also held the Fulbright Distinguished Chair in American Studies at University of Warsaw.

References

Year of birth missing (living people)
Living people
University of Alabama faculty
Academic staff of the University of Warsaw
American lawyers
Indiana University alumni